"Merry Christmas, Mr. Bean" is the seventh episode of the British television series Mr. Bean, produced by Tiger Television for Thames Television. It was first broadcast as a Christmas special on ITV on Tuesday 29 December 1992 as part of ITV's Christmas schedule and was watched by 18.48 million viewers during its original transmission.

This was the last episode to be co-written by Richard Curtis and the last to be broadcast by Thames Television on behalf of the ITV network. It also marks the last appearance of Mr. Bean's girlfriend, Irma Gobb (Matilda Ziegler) in the original television series until reappearing on Mr. Bean: The Animated Series ten years later.

Plot

Act 1: Christmas Shopping 
On Christmas Eve, Mr. Bean visits Harrods to buy decorations. As the cashier sorts out his purchases, Bean uses a Nativity display to act out a scene with other toys; his fun is brought to a halt by the store manager, who hands him his purchases, prompting Bean to leave. 

Bean heads to a local Christmas market and meets his girlfriend, Irma Gobb.  Irma drags Bean to a jewellery shop window and points at a ring she wants, but Bean buys a picture of a couple next to it, thinking this is what she is pointing to.

Bean volunteers to help the conductor of a brass band from the Salvation Army collect money; in doing so, he catches a pickpocket and forces him to hand over all of his stolen goods. Bean ends up conducting the band while the conductor tries on the jewellery.

Act 2: Christmas Eve 
In his flat after failing to pop a Christmas cracker, he stuffs multiple fuses into one big cracker. Later, Bean hangs up three Christmas stockings: one for Teddy, for himself, and for a mouse living in a hole. A group of young carol singers then come to his door and sing "Away in a Manger". Bean watches them, but grows tired and shuts the door on them before heading for bed.

Act 3: Christmas Day 
Bean wakes up and proceeds to the stockings and pulls out presents. Bean then prepares to cook a turkey, but loses his watch while stuffing it. He sticks his head inside the turkey to try and find it, but it gets stuck as Irma arrives. After Bean fails to conceal his predicament, Irma helps him remove the turkey by tying it to a coal scuttle and throwing it out the window. The turkey is lost, but Bean gets his watch back.

After Bean and Irma have dinner, Irma gifts Bean a model ship kit. Bean then gives Irma her present, but she is disappointed to find that it is the picture at the display window. She begins to cry, but Bean realizes that he "forgot the main bit" and takes out a ring box, much to Irma's surprise. When she opens the box, however, she discovers that it actually contains a hook meant for hanging the picture. Irma furiously exits the room, leaving Bean puzzled and hurt. He remembers his big cracker and decides to pull it, generating a loud explosion.

Cast 
 Rowan Atkinson – Mr. Bean
 Matilda Ziegler – Irma Gobb
 C. J. Allen - Santa outside Harrods
 Owen Brenman – Harrods clerk
 John Warner - Band conductor
 Lee Barrett - Pickpocket
 Jonathan Stratt

Production 
Most of the location scenes - set in a market - were shot on videotape in Kingston upon Thames. Studio sequences were recorded before a live audience at Thames Television's Teddington Studios. Following its broadcast on American cable television network HBO, this episode won the 1995 CableACE award for best comedy special.

In the scene, Bean participates in a "guess the weight" competition, with the large turkey from the episode, being the prize, and cheats to win it by using a hidden set of scales below the counter for the competition, alongside a calculator, whereupon the turkey is thrown into the boot of his Mini once he wins it. For unknown reasons, the A&E DVD release (distributed in the US by New Video) does not contain this scene.

A number of elements were used as inspiration for other programs. The 'lights on a well known building being accidentally switched off' gag is used by comedian Peter Kay at the end of his Live at the Top of the Tower DVD, while the turkey scene inspired a scene in an episode of Friends titled "The One with All the Thanksgivings", and later led to an adaptation for the film Bean, though it was cut out of the international release (outside North America) and reserved for a special feature section entitled "Bean Scenes Unseen". Another turkey gag was used in the Mr. Bean: The Animated Series episode "Dinner for Two".

During the nativity scene, Bean introduces a military marching band while humming "The British Grenadiers", which is used as the theme tune to Blackadder Goes Forth, another sitcom Rowan Atkinson starred in.

Deleted scene
An extended scene, included in some DVD versions, where Bean attempts to win the turkey he eventually ended up wearing on his head. The contest being to guess the turkey's weight, he sneaks a pair of scales to the counter; having already weighed himself, he subtracts his weight from the combined weight using a Casio calculator. The person in charge of the contest is shocked when Bean guesses the exact weight (to three decimal places) and wins it.

References

External links 
 

Mr. Bean episodes
1992 British television episodes
CableACE Award-winning episodes
British Christmas television episodes
Television shows written by Rowan Atkinson
Television shows written by Richard Curtis
Television shows written by Robin Driscoll